The Trap is a 1950 Czech drama film directed by Martin Frič. It was entered into the 1951 Cannes Film Festival.

Cast
 Vlasta Chramostová - Ruzena
 Jindra Hermanová - Woman Asking for Permission
 Miloslav Holub - Dönnert
 Vera Kalendová - Kraftová
 Otomar Krejča - Bor
 Jaroslav Mareš - Hans
 Karel Peyer - Cortus
 Vladimír Ráž - Antosch
 Majka Tomášová - Hertha

References

External links
 

1950 films
1950s war drama films
1950s Czech-language films
Czechoslovak black-and-white films
Films directed by Martin Frič
Czech war drama films
Czech resistance to Nazi occupation in film
1950 drama films
Czech World War II films
Czechoslovak World War II films
1950s Czech films